Bob Andrews may refer to:

 Bob Andrews (guitarist) (born 1959), English musician with Generation X
 Bob Andrews (keyboardist) (born 1949), English keyboardist with Brinsley Schwarz
 Bob Andrews (footballer) (1941–2005), Australian rules footballer
 Bob Andrews (rugby league), Australian rugby league footballer of the 1940s
 Bob Andrews (character), a character from the Three Investigators juvenile detective book series
 Bob Andrews (speedway rider) (born 1935), British/New Zealander speedway rider

See also
Robert Andrews (disambiguation)